Lisa Frances Ondieki (née O'Dea, formerly Martin; born 12 May 1960) is an Australian former long-distance runner. In the marathon, she won the 1988 Olympic silver medal and two Commonwealth Games gold medals. Other marathon victories included the 1988 Osaka International Ladies Marathon and the 1992 New York City Marathon. She also won the Great North Run Half Marathon three times. Her best time for the marathon of 2:23:51, set in 1988, made her the fourth-fastest female marathon runner in history at the time.

Career
Lisa O'Dea was born in Gawler, South Australia. She attended Gawler High School. She was originally a 400 m hurdler. Initially reluctant to take up the marathon, she won her first marathon competition, the Rocket City marathon in Huntsville USA in 1983, taking almost five minutes off the Australian record with her time of 2:32:22. In 1984, as Lisa Martin, she finished seventh in the inaugural women's Olympic marathon at the 1984 Los Angeles Olympics. Her time of 2:29:03 was the first of her eleven sub 2:30 marathons. Three months later, she finished second in the Chicago Marathon, with a new personal best time of 2:27:40.

At the 1985 Pittsburgh Marathon, she competed alongside her husband at the time, American distance runner Ken Martin; they became the fastest married couple ever in a marathon winning the men's and women's races in 2:12:57 and 2:31:54 respectively. Later that year, she finished second behind Greta Waitz in the New York City Marathon. She won the gold medal in the marathon at the 1986 Commonwealth Games in Edinburgh in a personal best of 2:26:07, with New Zealand's Lorraine Moller in second. A month later, she won the first of her three Great North Run Half Marathon titles in a personal best of 69:45. She ended the 1986 season by again finishing second to Waitz in the New York Marathon. She finished second in the 1987 Osaka marathon, behind Moller, then failed to finish the 1987 World Championship marathon in Rome.

In 1988, she ran her fastest ever marathon, when winning in Osaka with a time of 2:23:51, which at the time made her the fourth-fastest woman marathon runner in history, behind Ingrid Kristiansen, Joan Benoit and Rosa Mota. Later that year, she won a silver medal at the 1988 Seoul Olympics in 2:25:53, 13 seconds behind Mota. In January 1990, she retained her Commonwealth marathon title at the Auckland Games. In a solo performance, she finished over seven minutes ahead of silver medallist Australian team-mate Tani Ruckle. Her time of 2:25:28 remains a Games record (as of 2014). Divorced from Martin, she married Kenyan distance runner Yobes Ondieki in 1990 and missed the rest of that season due to pregnancy, giving birth to their daughter in November 1990. In 1991, she achieved her third top three finish at the New York Marathon, finishing third in a race won by Scotland's Liz McColgan.

In January 1992, she finished second in the Tokyo Half Marathon, running a lifetime best of 68:33, in a race won by McColgan in 67:11. In June, she ran her lifetime best 10,000 metres, running 31:11.72 in Helsinki. This time was the second fastest in the world in 1992, with only Olympic champion Derartu Tulu going faster (31:06). At the 1992 Barcelona Olympics, she failed to finish the marathon, having been one of the gold medal favourites. Three months later, she recovered to win the  New York City Marathon, setting a course record of 2:24:40 that would last for nine years. In 1993, she competed in the London Marathon for the first time. In a heavily hyped head-to head with Liz McColgan, they both lost out to Germany's Katrin Dorre, with Ondieki second and McColgan third. In 1994, she again finished second to Dorre in London.

In 1996, now divorced from Ondieki, she ran her fastest marathon time for three years with 2:30:57 in Osaka, to earn selection for her fourth and final Olympics. At the 1996 Atlanta Games, she failed to finish.

Recognition
Martin was inducted into the Sport Australia Hall of Fame in 1997. In 2000, she received an Australian Sports Medal. In 2014, she was inducted into the Athletics Australia Hall of Fame.

International competitions
All results regarding marathon, unless stated otherwise

Road races

References

External links
 
 Lisa Frances Ondieki (O'Dea/Martin) at Australian Athletics Historical Results
 

1960 births
Living people
Australian female long-distance runners
Australian female marathon runners
Sportswomen from South Australia
People from Gawler, South Australia
Olympic athletes of Australia
Olympic silver medalists in athletics (track and field)
Olympic silver medalists for Australia
Athletes (track and field) at the 1984 Summer Olympics
Athletes (track and field) at the 1988 Summer Olympics
Athletes (track and field) at the 1992 Summer Olympics
Athletes (track and field) at the 1996 Summer Olympics
Medalists at the 1988 Summer Olympics
Commonwealth Games gold medallists for Australia
Commonwealth Games medallists in athletics
Athletes (track and field) at the 1986 Commonwealth Games
Athletes (track and field) at the 1990 Commonwealth Games
Medallists at the 1986 Commonwealth Games
Medallists at the 1990 Commonwealth Games
World Athletics Championships athletes for Australia
New York City Marathon female winners
Australian Institute of Sport track and field athletes
Sport Australia Hall of Fame inductees
Recipients of the Australian Sports Medal
Oregon Ducks women's track and field athletes